Prasthala was the capital of king Susharman of Trigarta Kingdom. As per the epic Mahabharata, this city was under the constant attack of Matsya kings like the king Virata. Susharman tried to avenge the Matsyas with the help of Duryodhana of Hastinapura, but the attempt was foiled by the Pandavas staying in the domains of the Matsyas. Prasthala is identified to be the modern city Patiala in Punjab, India.

References

Ancient Indian cities
Jalandhar